Richard Wysocki (born June 5, 1993, in Brunswick, Ohio) is an American professional disc golfer based in Fort Mill, South Carolina. Wysocki grew up in Medina, Ohio, near Roscoe Ewing Disc Golf Course.

Wysocki turned pro in 2010. His career earnings are $536,842 (as of May 2022). Wysocki is a 2-time PDGA - World Champion and is widely regarded as one of the best players in the world. As of May 2022, Wysocki is currently the second highest rated player in the world behind Paul McBeth. On January 4, 2022, Wysocki signed a 4-year/$4 million contract with Dynamic Discs. Wysocki's contract pays him a base salary of $1 million a year with potential to reach $2 million per year depending on the amount of discs Dynamic Discs sells with Wysocki's name on it. Additionally, Wysocki's contract included a $250,000 signing bonus paid to Ricky in Bitcoin.

Professional wins (122 total) 

Wysocki won the PDGA Rookie of the Year Award in 2011 and the Male Player of the Year Award in 2012, the only male player to win the two back-to-back. Wysocki won the PDGA-World Championship two times (2016-2017), defeating 6x World Champ Paul McBeth both times. Also in 2016, he won the PDGA National Tour Series, the Disc Golf World Tour Points series, and the Disc Golf Pro Tour points series.

Majors (4)

National Tour/DGPT Elite (22) 

National Tour/DGPT Elite Wins: 25

Summary

*As of May 2022

Annual statistics

*As of Jan 2023

†At Year End

References

American disc golfers
Living people
1993 births
People from Brunswick, Ohio
People from Fort Mill, South Carolina